Seticosta marcapatae is a species of moth of the family Tortricidae. It is found in Peru and Bolivia.

The wingspan is 17 mm. The forewings are brown with darker marks and the whitish ground colour limited to lines. The hindwings are dirty cream with diffuse brownish grey posterior suffusion and strigulation (fine streaks).

Etymology
The species name refers to the type locality.

References

Moths described in 2010
Seticosta